In Lithuanian history, Sarmatism is a term used to refer to various nationalist pseudohistorical theories which seek to refute traditional understanding of the history of Lithuania and propose that the medieval Grand Duchy of Lithuania is a continuation of states and ethnic groups in Eastern Europe attested before the first mention of the name of Lithuania recorded in the Annals of Quedlinburg in 1009. The name comes from Sarmatia, a term used in Greco-Roman cartography, notably the Geography of Ptolemy, to label all of Eastern Europe, and which is generally believed by Sarmatist historians to refer to the extent of Antiquity-era Lithuania.

These theories lack support in the Lithuanian historical community, and are criticized for amateurish linguistics, selective use of historical data, and extreme nationalism.

Background 
Sarmatist interpretation of Lithuanian history was started by diplomat, translator, polyglot and historian Česlovas Gedgaudas, detailed in the book Mūsų praeities beieškant (Searching for Our Past). It was published in Mexico City in 1972.

Mūsų praeities beieškant was published in Lithuania after the fall of the Soviet Union and became a seminal work among the community. Jurate Rosales refers to Gedgaudas in her works and is herself referenced in Mūsų praeities beieškant for her systematic comparison of Baltic languages and the Spanish language to prove the Baltic origins of the Visigoths.

Interest in Sarmatist theory was renewed by the one thousand year anniversary of the first mention of the name of Lithuania in the Annals of Quedlinburg in 2009. This anniversary was criticised by Aivaras Lileika for dismissing the history of Lithuania prior to 1009 as well as the refusal to accept the connection between Lithuania and Antiquity-era Sarmatia. Lileika also proposed renaming the country of Lithuania to Sarmatia.

Sarmatist-influenced works were published during the following decade, such as a study of the use of "European Sarmatia" as a name for Eastern Europe in Greco-Roman cartography by Romualdas Girkus and Viktoras Lukoševičius and the works of Lithuanian-born Venezuelan journalist Jurate Rosales.

Sarmatas (The Sarmatian) was founded as a news site in 2010 and continues to exist today. It presents itself as an alternative media site and has been criticized for spreading anti-vaccine, anti-LGBT rhetoric.

Key traits 
The primary goal of Sarmatist historians is to find connections between the Lithuanian peoples and ethnic groups attested in Early Medieval and ancient texts and establish continuity between the medieval Grand Duchy of Lithuania and previous eras, and generally state:
 The state of Lithuania existed continuously for three thousand years, under different names such as Sarmatia, Gudija, Gardarikė and Rasa. This state was an expansive empire which occupied most of Eastern Europe. Rather than being first established in the early 13th century, Lithuania was reestablished after a collapse which took place in the preceding centuries. According to Gedgaudas, this collapse took place after the conversion of Vladimir the Great to Christianity, which broke apart the Lithuanian empire of Rasa (Kievan Rus) and began the Slavicization of modern day Belarus, Ukraine and Western Russia.
 Ancient and Migration Period peoples, such as the Goths, Ostrogoths, Visigoths, Heruli, Gepids, Getae, Vandals, Sarmatians, Cimmerians, Vikings and Franks, are considered to be of Baltic origin. Their names and vocabulary are reconstructed from original attestations to Lithuanian language. As an example, Early Medieval Frankish aristocracy, is reconstructed to liaudai, derived from liaudis. Lothair I is reconstructed to Liaudavarys, a construct of the aforementioned liaudai and varyti.
 The existence of the Indo-European languages is a hoax and an attempt by German and other linguists to explain the presence of a Baltic language superstratum in other European languages. The lexical similarities between Indo-European languages are proof of borrowing from Baltic languages or outright descendance from them.
 This knowledge was suppressed with the combined efforts of the Roman Catholic Church, German and Slavic nationalists, and the Soviet Union.

Reconstructed chronology 
In Mūsų praeities beieškant, Gedgaudas reconstructs the chronology of ancient Lithuanian history and states that Lithuania was originally founded in 1490 BC, or 3462 years before the time of the book's publication. In the preamble of the book, after invoking ancient Lithuanian gods reconstructed later in the book for strength, Gedgaudas refers to this date in place of the traditional Gregorian calendar date:

The reconstructed chronology from this foundation date to the beginning of traditionally attested history is detailed in four charts.

I. State of Gemariai

II. Šermačia

III. March of Giants 
Chart III details the ruling dynasties of the main conquering armies during the Migration Period. According to Gedgaudas, no large scale migrations took place during the Migration Period, and the attested barbarian kingdoms were fiefs established by commanders of the armies of the Sarmatian-Gudish-Lithuanian empire during their conquest of the Roman Empire. The conquering armies left a Baltic language influence upon the Latin language, forming the modern Romance languages.

IV. Empire of Gardarikė 
Chart IV details the period between the Migration Period and 1200 AD. The Amali dynasty is attested by Gedgaudas to have been the ruling dynasty of the empire of Gardarikė in Central and Eastern Europe until its extinction, at which point Rurik (written by Gedgaudas as Varių Rikis) is invited to rule the empire, now named Rasa (Kievan Rus). The empire splits and collapses after the conversion of Vladimir the Great to Christianity, which broke apart the empire of Rasa and began the Slavicization of modern day Belarus, Ukraine and Western Russia. Mindaugas, the first traditionally attested ruler of Lithuania, eventually inherits the crown in 1253.

According to Gedgaudas, the expansion of the Grand Duchy of Lithuania in the 13th and 14th centuries was motivated by the House of Gediminas seeking to reunite this ancient empire.

Adherents 
 Česlovas Gedgaudas
 Romualdas Girkus and Viktoras Lukoševičius
 Jurate Rosales and Aleksandras Račkus, considered by Zigmas Zinkevičius to be a part of the same school

References

External links 
 Full text of Mūsų praeities beieškant (in Lithuanian)

Ethnocentrism
Pseudoscience
Pseudohistory
Lithuanian nationalism
National mysticism